Hobsons Shops is a heritage-listed retail building at 75 Herbert Street, Gulgong, Mid-Western Regional Council, New South Wales, Australia. It was added to the New South Wales State Heritage Register on 2 April 1999.

Description

It consists of two shops dating from  1880 on the corner of Herbert Street and Bayly Street. It was operating as an old wares business, the Golden West Trading Post, when the building was granted a permanent conservation order in 1985, and is alternatively referred to by this name in various documents.

Heritage listing 
Hobsons Shops was listed on the New South Wales State Heritage Register on 2 April 1999.

See also

References

Attribution 

New South Wales State Heritage Register
Retail buildings in New South Wales
Articles incorporating text from the New South Wales State Heritage Register
Mid-Western Regional Council